Patrick Lory House (born September 1, 1940 in Boise, Idaho) is a former left-handed Major League Baseball (MLB) relief pitcher who played from 1967 to 1968 for the Houston Astros.

Before being signed by the Milwaukee Braves as an amateur free agent in 1962, House had attended Boise State University and University of Wyoming.

On November 29, 1966, House was drafted by the Astros from the Braves in the minor league draft. He made his major league debut on September 6, 1967 against the San Francisco Giants. In his first big league game, he threw a perfect inning in relief of Tom Dukes. The first batter House faced in the Major Leagues was Hall of Fame slugger Willie McCovey.

House played in a total of six games in 1967, allowing two runs in four innings for a 4.50 ERA.

His sophomore — and final — season was far less successful. Although it was "The Year of the Pitcher" — in which the league ERA was 2.96 — House posted a 7.71 ERA in 16 innings of work. In 18 games, he walked six and struck out six batters.

Overall, House pitched in a total of 24 games in his career, posting a 2–1 record and 7.08 ERA. Although he gave up 17 runs in 20 innings, none of those runs was the result of a home run. He did hit a rather high number of batters — about one every 6 innings. In the field, House had a 1.000 fielding percentage.

He played his final big league game on September 29, 1968, although he stuck around in the minors through 1971. On December 16, 1969, he was traded by the Astros with Dooley Womack to the Cincinnati Reds for Jim Beauchamp. House never played in the majors with the Reds.

He wore number 43 throughout his major league career.

References

External links
, or Baseball Almanac, or Retrosheet
Pura Pelota (Venezuelan Winter League)

1940 births
Living people
Austin Braves players
Austin Senators players
Baseball players from Idaho
Boise Braves players
Boise State Broncos baseball players
Boise State University alumni
Denver Bears players
Houston Astros players
Indianapolis Indians players
Lynchburg White Sox players
Major League Baseball pitchers
Navegantes del Magallanes players
American expatriate baseball players in Venezuela
Oklahoma City 89ers players
Portland Beavers players
Richmond Braves players
Sportspeople from Boise, Idaho
Wyoming Cowboys baseball players